Hamid Garmabi (born 1961) is an Iranian engineer and reformist politician who is currently a member of the Parliament of Iran representing Nishapur. He was chancellor of Amir Kabir University's Faculty of Engineering Polymer and Color before being elected as a parliament member.

References

Living people
1961 births
Iranian engineers
Members of the 10th Islamic Consultative Assembly
People from Nishapur